The 55th edition of the Men's World Allround Speed Skating Championships was held on 11 and 12 March 1994 at the  Ruddalens Idrottsplats in Göteborg, Sweden.

The field consisted of 34 speed skaters from 18 countries. 

Johann Olav Koss won the world title ahead of Keiji Shirahata and Roberto Sighel. It was his third world title after 1990 and 1991.

Distance medals

Standings

References

External links
 Results on SpeedSkatingNews

1994 World Allround
World Allround Speed Skating Championships
Men's World Allround. 1994